Hawkinsville is a ghost town in Matagorda County, Texas, United States that formerly had a distinct community. In 2018, there were a few homes nearby, several businesses one mile to the south, and the name appeared on maps, but one source refers to the place in the past tense while a second source states that the town disappeared in the 1950s. The town site is between Cedar Lane and Sargent.

Geography
A bend of Caney Creek comes near FM 457 at the location. A single home can be seen near the historic location.

History
The town was named in honor of James Boyd Hawkins, a planter from North Carolina who established the Hawkins Ranch, a cotton and sugarcane plantation, later a cattle ranch, in Matagorda County.

Education
Van Vleck Independent School District operates schools in the area.

The designated community college for Van Vleck ISD is Wharton County Junior College.

Notes

References

Unincorporated communities in Matagorda County, Texas
Unincorporated communities in Texas